Tready Softly/The Violin Case Murders (German title:Schüsse aus dem Geigenkasten) is a 1965 German thriller film directed by Fritz Umgelter and starring George Nader, Heinz Weiss and Sylvia Pascal. It is the first in the Jerry Cotton series of films.

Plot
A prolific bunch of safe crackers retrieves a great deal of booty. They work all over the US and kill everybody standing in their way. Once it is brought to the notice of FBI director Mr. High that these crimes are committed by the same gangsters,  he doesn't hesitate to assign special agent Jerry Cotton. Pretending to be a criminal himself, special agent Cotton joins the criminal underworld. He demonstrates his toughness by beating up some street fighters in a bar and pretends he wanted to join forces with a gang of equally ruthless characters. After he has managed to infiltrate the targeted gang, he eventually finds himself in a duel with their boss Kilborne.

Cast
 George Nader ...  Jerry Cotton
 Heinz Weiss ...  Phil Decker
 Richard Münch ...  Mr. High
 Sylvia Pascal ...  Kitty Springfield
 Helga Schlack ...  Helen
 Helmut Förnbacher ...  Percy
 Philippe Guégan ...  Sniff
 Hans E. Schons ...  Christallo
 Hans Waldherr ...  Babe
 Heidi Leupolt ...  Mary Springfield
 Franz Rudnick ...  Dr. Jim Kilborne
 Robert Rathke ...  Latschek

Bibliography

References

External links

1965 films
West German films
1960s crime thriller films
German crime thriller films
1960s German-language films
Films directed by Fritz Umgelter
Films set in the United States
German black-and-white films
Films based on crime novels
Films based on German novels
1960s German films